"Black" is a song by American rapper YoungBoy Never Broke Again, released on January 4, 2023 as a promotional single from his album I Rest My Case (2023). It was produced by Jasiah, Kid Krazy, and Powers Pleasant.

Composition
Robin Murray of Clash wrote that the song shows an "explosive anthem, the kind of arena-level trap. Critics further note that the track "come[s] equipped with the buzzsaw synthesizers, sci-fi laser blasts, and pounding 808s."

Music video
An accompanying music video was released on January 6, 2022. It finds YoungBoy inviting fans to his Utah home where he and his fans have a snowball fight while are seen dancing and getting "sturdy".

Personnel
Credits adapted from Tidal.

 YoungBoy Never Broke Again – vocals
 Jason "Cheese" Goldberg – mastering, mixing
 Khris "XO" James – engineering

Charts

References

2023 singles
2023 songs
Motown singles
YoungBoy Never Broke Again songs
Songs written by YoungBoy Never Broke Again